The 2019 season is Yangon United's 10th season in the Myanmar National League since 2009.

Season Review

2019 First team squad

Transfer

Transfer In

Transfer Out

Coaching staff

|}

Other information

|-

Competition

Myanmar National League

References

Yangon United